Borapansury I is an Indian village in Chawngte Block of Lawngtlai district, part of the Chakma Autonomous District Council, in Mizoram, India. As of the 2011 Census of India, the population is approximately 1367, of which 726 were male and 641 female belonging to Chakma people. It is situated near the Thega River, lies to the west as per the map of Chakma Autonomous District Council which borders to Bangladesh and serve as the International Border between India and Bangladesh, Borapansury II to the east, Kurvalovasora to the north, and Ugalsury to its south. Agriculture and government employment are the main sources of livelihood. Borapansury is considered as the most literate village in Chakma Autonomous District Council.

External links
 Borapansury

Villages in Chakma Autonomous District Council